Hypostomus brevicauda is a species of catfish in the family Loricariidae. It is native to South America, where it occurs in the coastal drainages of eastern Brazil. The species reaches 19.6 cm (7.7 inches) SL and is believed to be a facultative air-breather.

References 

Fish described in 1864
Hypostominae
Taxa named by Albert Günther
Fish of South America